

The Kensgaila VK-8 Aušra is a 1980s Lithuanian single-seat agricultural monoplane designed by Vladas Kensgaila and built by Kensgaila Aircraft Enterprize.

Design and development
The VK-8 Ausra is a metal and composite monoplane with a fixed landing gear with a tailwheel. The Ausra has side-by-side seating for two and is powered by a  AOOT M-14P radial piston engine.

Specifications

References

Notes

Bibliography

1980s Lithuanian agricultural aircraft
Single-engined tractor aircraft
Aircraft first flown in 1989